Stylisma pickeringii, commonly called Pickering's dawnflower, is a species of flowering plant in the morning glory family (Convolvulaceae). It is native to the United States, where it patchily distributed across central and eastern regions. Its natural habitat is in dry sandhill prairies. It is apparently tolerant of ecologically disturbed conditions, and can persist in degraded former sand prairies.

Stylisma pickeringii is perennial that grows sprawling across the ground. It has linear leaves 1-3 mm wide. It produces white flowers from May to August.

Taxonomy
Two varieties of Stylisma pickeringii are currently recognized. They are:
S. pickeringii var. pattersonii - Native to the South Central Region, the Great Plains, and the Midwest.
S. pickeringii var. pickeringii - Native to the Southeastern United States and disjunct in New Jersey

References

Convolvulaceae
Taxa named by John Torrey
Taxa named by Asa Gray
Taxa named by Moses Ashley Curtis